The Midnight Sun is a 1926 American silent drama film directed by Dimitri Buchowetzki and starring Laura La Plante, Pat O'Malley, and Michael Vavitch. It is based on a novel by the French writer Pierre Benoît. The film is set in pre-Revolutionary Tsarist Russia.

The film includes a brief scene shot in Technicolor.

Cast

Production
Some on-location scenes were filmed in Truckee, California.

Preservation
A complete print of The Midnight Sun is located in the UCLA Film and Television Archive. It has not been released to the public on dvd or other format.

References

Bibliography
 Munden, Kenneth White. The American Film Institute Catalog of Motion Pictures Produced in the United States, Part 1. University of California Press, 1997.

External links

Still at silentfilmstillarchive.com
Still 1 and 2 of Pearl Dancers from the Ballet of Jewels, from www.gettyimages.com

1926 films
1926 drama films
Silent American drama films
American silent feature films
1920s English-language films
Universal Pictures films
Films directed by Dimitri Buchowetzki
Films set in Russia
Films set in the 1910s
Films based on French novels
American black-and-white films
Silent films in color
1920s American films